The 1989 Detroit Drive season was the second season for the Drive. They finished 3–1 and won ArenaBowl III.

Regular season

Schedule

Standings

Playoffs

Roster

Awards

Detroit Drive Season, 1989
Detroit Drive
Massachusetts Marauders
ArenaBowl champion seasons